Akbıyık can refer to:

 Akbıyık, Hizan
 Akbıyık, Yenişehir